The Gunbower National Park is a national park located in the Loddon Mallee region of Victoria, Australia. The park contains the Gunbower Forest Ramsar wetlands site for the protection of migratory bird species.

See also

 Protected areas of Victoria

References

National parks of Victoria (Australia)
Protected areas established in 2010
2010 establishments in Australia
Ramsar sites in Australia
Murray-Darling basin